The 1996–97 NBA season was the Pistons' 49th season in the National Basketball Association, and 40th season in the city of Detroit. During the off-season, the Pistons acquired Stacey Augmon and Grant Long from the Atlanta Hawks, and re-signed free agent and former "Bad Boy" Rick Mahorn, who was a member of the 1989 championship team that defeated the Los Angeles Lakers in the Finals. The team also signed three-point specialist Kenny Smith, who won two championships with the Houston Rockets, but was released to free agency in November after nine games. The Pistons got off to a fast start winning ten of their first eleven games on their way to a 20–4 start, and later holding a 34–12 record at the All-Star break. 

At mid-season, the team traded Augmon to the Portland Trail Blazers in exchange for Aaron McKie. Despite their successful start, the Pistons struggled a bit down the stretch posting a 20–16 record for the remainder of the season, losing six of their final nine games. The Pistons finished third in the Central Division with a 54–28 record, which was their first 50-win season since 1991 and would be their last until 2002.

Grant Hill averaged 21.4 points, 9.0 rebounds, 7.3 assists and 1.8 steals per game, while being named to the All-NBA First Team, and finishing in third place in Most Valuable Player behind Karl Malone and Michael Jordan, while Joe Dumars averaged 14.7 points and 4.0 assists per game. Hill, Dumars and head coach Doug Collins represented the Eastern Conference during the 1997 NBA All-Star Game; it was also Dumars' sixth and final All-Star appearance. In addition, Lindsey Hunter showed improvement averaging 14.2 points and 1.6 steals per game, while Otis Thorpe provided the team with 13.1 points and 7.9 rebounds per game, and sixth man Terry Mills contributed 10.8 points and 4.3 rebounds per game off the bench, and led the team with 175 three-point field goals. Second-year center Theo Ratliff averaged 5.8 points and 1.5 blocks per game, and Long provided with 5.0 points and 3.4 rebounds per game.

In the Eastern Conference First Round of the playoffs, the Pistons took a 2–1 series lead over the Atlanta Hawks, but lost the next two games, thus losing the series in five games. Following the season, Thorpe was traded to the Vancouver Grizzlies after feuding with Collins, while Mills signed as a free agent with the Miami Heat, and Michael Curry signed with the Milwaukee Bucks.

For the season, the Pistons revealed a new primary logo of a flaming horse head, and changed their uniforms replacing blue with teal to their color scheme. The new primary logo and uniforms both remained in use until 2001.

Draft picks

Roster

Regular season

Season standings

z - clinched division title
y - clinched division title
x - clinched playoff spot

Record vs. opponents

Game log

Playoffs

|- align="center" bgcolor="#ffcccc"
| 1
| April 25
| @ Atlanta
| L 75–89
| Grant Hill (20)
| Grant Hill (14)
| Grant Hill (7)
| Omni Coliseum15,795
| 0–1
|- align="center" bgcolor="#ccffcc"
| 2
| April 27
| @ Atlanta
| W 93–80
| Grant Hill (25)
| Otis Thorpe (8)
| Grant Hill (3)
| Omni Coliseum16,378
| 1–1
|- align="center" bgcolor="#ccffcc"
| 3
| April 29
| Atlanta
| W 99–91
| Lindsey Hunter (26)
| Terry Mills (7)
| Grant Hill (8)
| The Palace of Auburn Hills20,059
| 2–1
|- align="center" bgcolor="#ffcccc"
| 4
| May 2
| Atlanta
| L 82–94
| Grant Hill (28)
| Terry Mills (10)
| three players tied (3)
| The Palace of Auburn Hills21,454
| 2–2
|- align="center" bgcolor="#ffcccc"
| 5
| May 4
| @ Atlanta
| L 79–84
| Grant Hill (21)
| Lindsey Hunter (9)
| Grant Hill (6)
| Omni Coliseum16,378
| 2–3
|-

Player statistics

Regular season

Playoffs

Player Statistics Citation:

Awards and records
Grant Hill, All-NBA First Team

Transactions

 July 15, 1996: Signed Michael Curry; Released Mark West and Lou Roe
 July 15, 1996: Traded a 1997 2nd Round Draft Pick (which became Alain Digbeu), two 1999 1st Round Draft Picks (Cal Bowdler and Dion Glover) and one 1999 2nd Round Draft Pick (Lari Ketner) to the Atlanta Hawks for Stacey Augmon and Grant Long
 August 5, 1996: Signed Rick Mahorn
 August 30, 1996: Signed Litterial Green
 September 17, 1996: Signed Kenny Smith
 November 23, 1996: Waived Kenny Smith
 January 24, 1997: Acquired Randolph Childress, Reggie Jordan and Aaron McKie from the Portland Trail Blazers for Stacey Augmon
 February 18, 1997: Waived Reggie Jordan

Player Transactions Citation:

References

See also
1996-97 NBA season

Detroit Pistons seasons
Detroit
Detroit
Detroit